God of This City is a live recording released by the Passion. It features many prominent Christian Contemporary Praise and Worship artists, such as Chris Tomlin, Charlie Hall, David Crowder Band, and Matt Redman. It was released worldwide on February 5, 2008, and peaked at No. 72 on the Billboard 200 Albums chart on February 23, 2008.

The recording is named after the track "God of This City", written by Bluetree and covered by Chris Tomlin. In 2009, American Idol winner Kris Allen has been known to perform "God of This City" in his concerts.

Track listing

Musicians

Chris Tomlin
 Chris Tomlin - acoustic guitar, lead vocals
 Jesse Reeves - bass
 Daniel Carson - electric guitar
 Matt Gilder - keyboard
 Travis Nunn - drums

Charlie Hall
 Charlie Hall - acoustic and electric guitar, lead vocals
 Kendall Combes - electric guitar
 Brian Bergman - keyboards
 Dustin Ragland - drums
 Quint Anderson - bass

David Crowder Band
 David Crowder - acoustic guitar, lead vocals
 Jack Parker - electric guitar
 Mike Hogan - violin and beats
 Mike Dodson - bass
 Jeremy Bush - drums
 Mark Waldrop - electric guitar

Christy Nockels
 Christy Nockels - lead vocals
 with Chris Tomlin's band

Kristian Stanfill
 Kristian Stanfill - acoustic guitar, lead vocals
 with Chris Tomlin's band

Fee
 Steve Fee - electric guitar, vocals
 Matt Adkins - electric guitar
 Heath Baltzglier - bass
 Brandon Coker - drums

Matt Redman
 Matt Redman - acoustic guitar, lead vocals
 Andrew Philips - keyboard
 with Chris Tomlin's band

Additional vocals
 Alvin Love (on "Let God Arise" and "Amazing Grace (My Chains are Gone)")
 Ashley Love (on "Let God Arise" and "Amazing Grace (My Chains are Gone)")
 Jimmy McNeal (on "God of This City" and "Sing, Sing, Sing")
 Jonas Myrin (on "God of our Yesterdays" and "Dancing Generation")
 Christy Nockels (on "Let God Arise", "God of This City", "Sing, Sing, Sing", "Dancing Generation" and "Amazing Grace (My Chains are Gone)")
 Nathan Nockels
 Nirva Dorsaint-Ready (on "Let God Arise" and "Amazing Grace (My Chains are Gone)")
 Seth Ready (on "God of This City" and "Sing, Sing, Sing")
 Kristian Stanfill (on "Let God Arise" and "Amazing Grace (My Chains are Gone)")

Recording
The live recording of this album occurred during a span of approximately one year during Passion 2007 at Atlanta, and the Passion Regionals at Boston and Chicago.

Recorded at Passion 2007
 "Let God Arise"
 "You are God"
 "O for a Thousand Tongues to Sing"
 "Walk the World"
 "The Glory of it All"
 "Shine"
 "Amazing Grace (My Chains are Gone)"

Recorded at Boston
 "We Shine"

Recorded at Chicago
 "God of This City"
 "Hosanna"
 "Sing, Sing, Sing"
 "Beautiful Jesus"
 "God of our Yesterdays"
 "Dancing Generation"

Awards 

In 2009, the album won a Dove Award for Special Event Album of the Year at the 40th GMA Dove Awards.

References

Passion Conferences albums
2008 live albums